Saint-Bonnet-de-Rochefort (Auvergnat: Sant Bonet de Ròchafòrt) is a commune in the Allier department in Auvergne-Rhône-Alpes in central France.

Geography 
Saint-Bonnet-de-Rochefort is located in the south of the Allier department,  of Gannat,  of Vicq by departmental road 37;  of Ébreuil and Charroux by D35.

Population

See also
Communes of the Allier department

References

Communes of Allier
Allier communes articles needing translation from French Wikipedia